Theagenes of Rhegium (Theagenēs ho Rhēginos; fl. 529–522 BC) was a Greek literary critic of the 6th century BC. Born in Rhegium (modern Reggio Calabria), he is noted for having defended the mythology of Homer from more rationalist attacks. In so doing he became an early proponent of the allegorical method of reading texts.

All that he wrote is lost to contemporary history. Information about his life has been available in the existing documents written by his contemporaries, and of those of future generations, these having felt his influence.

Notes

External links
Old dictionary entry

Ancient Greek grammarians
Ancient Rhegians
6th-century BC Greek people
Writers of Magna Graecia